Year 1551 (MDLI) was a common year starting on Thursday (link will display the full calendar) of the Julian calendar.

Events 
 January–June 
 January–February – Macarius, Metropolitan of Moscow, and Tsar Ivan IV of Russia preside over the reforming Stoglavy Synod ("Hundred-Chapter") church council. A calendar of the saints and an ecclesiastical law code (Stoglav) are introduced.
 January 11 – Ketumati, Burma, is conquered by Bayinnaung.
 May 1 – The Council of Trent reconvenes by order of Pope Julius III.
 May 12 – The National University of San Marcos is founded in Lima (Peru), being the first officially established university in the Americas.

 July–December 
 By July – Fifth and last outbreak of sweating sickness in England. John Caius of Shrewsbury writes the first full contemporary account of the symptoms of the disease.
 July – Invasion of Gozo: Ottoman Turks and Barbary pirates invade the Mediterranean island of Gozo, enslaving all inhabitants (estimated at 5,000 to 6,000) and transporting them to Tarhuna Wa Msalata (in modern-day Libya).
 August 15 – The Siege of Tripoli ends, with the Knights of Malta surrendering Tripoli to the Ottoman Empire.
 September 21 – The Royal and Pontifical University of Mexico is founded in Mexico City (Mexico), being the second officially established university in the Americas.
 September 30 – Tainei-ji incident: A coup in Yamaguchi, by the military establishment of the Ōuchi clan, forces their lord Ōuchi Yoshitaka to commit suicide, and the city is burned.
 October 11 – John Dudley, Earl of Warwick, de facto Lord Protector of the Kingdom of England, is created Duke of Northumberland.

 Date unknown 
 Qizilbash forces under the command of Tahmasp I raid and destroy the cave monastery of Vardzia in Georgia.
 In Henan province, China, during the Ming dynasty, a severe frost in the spring destroys the winter wheat crop. Torrential rains in mid summer cause massive flooding of farmland and villages (by some accounts submerged in a metre of water). In the fall, a large tornado demolishes houses and flattens much of the buckwheat in the fields. Famine victims either flee, starve, or resort to cannibalism. This follows a series of natural disasters in Henan in the years 1528, 1531, 1539, and 1545.
 In Slovakia, Guta (modern-day Kolárovo) receives town status.
 Portugal founds a sugar colony at Bahia.
 Juan de Betanzos begins to write his Narrative of the Incas.
 The new edition of the Genevan psalter, is published, with Louis Bourgeois as supervising composer, including the first publication of the hymn tune known as the Old 100th.

Births 

 January 5 – Jean Chapeauville, Belgian theologian and historian (d. 1617)
 January 14 – Abu'l-Fazl ibn Mubarak,  Grand vizier of the Mughal emperor Akbar (d. 1602)
 January 26 – Robert Dormer, 1st Baron Dormer, English politician (d. 1616)
 February 2 – Nicolaus Reimers, German astronomer (d. 1600)
 March 9 – Alessandro Alberti, Italian painter (d. 1596)
 March 21 – Maria Anna of Bavaria (d. 1608)
 March 30 – Salomon Schweigger, German theologian (d. 1622)
 April 9 – Peter Monau, German physician (d. 1588)
 April 30 – Jacopo da Empoli, Italian painter (d. 1640)
 May 2 – William Camden, English historian (d. 1623)
 May 8 – Thomas Drury, English government informer and swindler (d. 1603)
 May 17 – Martin Delrio, Flemish theologian and occultist (d. 1608)
 September 19 – King Henry III of France (d. 1589)
 October 4 – Philip VI, Count of Waldeck (1567–1579) (d. 1579)
 October 8 – Giulio Caccini, Italian composer (d. 1618)
 October 26 – Charlotte de Sauve, French courtesan (d. 1617)
 November 11 – Giovanni I Cornaro, Doge of Venice (d. 1629)
 date unknown
 Bhai Gurdas – original scribe of Guru Granth Sahib
 George Tuchet, 1st Earl of Castlehaven (d. 1617)
 Fausto Veranzio, Dalmatian/Croatian polymath, bishop, humanist (d. 1617)
 Job of Pochayiv, Ukrainian Christian Orthodox Saint (d. 1651)
 probable
 Patrick Galloway, Moderator of the General Assembly of the Church of Scotland (d. c.1626)
 Boris Godunov, Tsar of Russia (d. 1605)
 Stanisław Stadnicki, Polish nobleman (d. 1610)

Deaths 

 February 4 – John V, Prince of Anhalt-Zerbst, Prince of Anahlt-Dessau (1516–1544) and Anhalt-Zerbst (1544–1551) (b. 1504)
 February 28 – Martin Bucer, German Protestant reformer (b. 1491)
 April 6 – Joachim Vadian, Swiss humanist (b. 1484)
 April 8 – Oda Nobuhide, Japanese warlord (b. 1510)
 May 8 – Barbara Radziwiłł, queen of Sigismund II of Poland (b. 1523)
 May 17 – Shin Saimdang, Korean artist, calligrapher and writer (b. 1504)
 May 18 – Domenico di Pace Beccafumi, Italian painter (b. 1486)
 June 24 – Charles II de Croÿ, Belgian duke (b. 1522)
 July – Adriaen Isenbrandt, Flemish painter (b. 1490)
 July 13 – John Wallop, English soldier and diplomat (b. 1490)
 July 14 – Henry Brandon, 2nd Duke of Suffolk (b. 1535)
 August 8 – Fray Tomás de Berlanga, Bishop of Panama (b. 1487)
 August 12 – Paul Speratus, German Lutheran (b. 1484)
 August 26 – Margaret Leijonhufvud, queen of Gustav I of Sweden (b. 1516)
 September 30 – Ōuchi Yoshitaka, Japanese warlord (b. 1507)
 November 20 – Hindal Mirza, Mughal Empire emperor (b. 1519)
 date unknown
 Sagara Taketō, Japanese samurai (b. 1498)
 Helena Ungler, Polish printer
 Alice Arden, English murderer (b. 1516; executed by burning)

References